Joyce Bath (27 February 1925 – 19 March 2006) was an Australian cricketer.

Bath played three Test matches for the Australia national women's cricket team.

References

1925 births
2006 deaths
Australia women Test cricketers
Cricketers from Victoria (Australia)
Sportspeople from Bendigo